Rider Broncs basketball may refer to either of the basketball teams that represent Rider University:
Rider Broncs men's basketball
Rider Broncs women's basketball